Willingale is a village and civil parish in the Epping Forest district of Essex, England. The civil parish also includes the village of Shellow Bowells and the hamlet of Miller's Green. The population of the civil parish at the 2011 census was 501. Willingale has two churches in one churchyard: one dedicated to St Christopher; the other to St Andrew. The civil parish of Willingale was created on 1 April 1946 from the parishes of Shellow Bowells, Willingale Doe and Willingale Spain. Willingale Doe and Spain were recorded in the Domesday Book of 1086 as Ulinghehala/Willing(h)ehala''.

Richard Wiseman (1632 - 1712), landowner and member of parliament was born in the village.

Clopton Havers (24 February 1657 – April 1702) was an English physician who did pioneering research on the microstructure of bone. He is believed to have been the first person to observe and almost certainly the first to describe what are now called Haversian canals and Sharpey's fibres. Havers married Dorcas Fuller, daughter of Thomas Fuller, the Rector of Willingale, Essex. Havers died in Willingale in 1702 and was buried at Willingale Doe, Essex. His funeral sermon, dedicated to his widow, was preached by Lilly Butler, minister of St Mary Aldermanbury in London, and was later printed in quarto.

See also 
 RAF Chipping Ongar, a former World War II airfield

References

External links 

Villages in Essex
Civil parishes in Essex
Epping Forest District